Pwllheli F.C. is a football club based in Pwllheli in North Wales. They play in the North Wales Coast West Football League Premier Division and play at the Recreation Ground.

History
The club was formed in November 1879. The club were captained by William Davies in their first ever game against Porthmadog.

References

External links
 http://www.pitchero.com/clubs/cpdpwllhelifc

Football clubs in Wales
Welsh Alliance League clubs
Association football clubs established in 1878
Pwllheli
Gwynedd League clubs
North Wales Coast Football League clubs
Caernarfon & District League clubs
Welsh National League (North) clubs
Bangor & District League clubs
North Wales Coast League clubs